The Bashundhara Kings is a professional football club based in Bashundhara Residential Area, Dhaka, Bangladesh.

History
Bashundhara Kings played their first match in 2017 against Uttar Baridhara SC. They won their first-ever title in the same year, lifting 2017 Bangladesh Championship League.

Major titles

League
 Bangladesh Premier League
Winners (1): 2018–19
 Bangladesh Championship League
Winners (1): 2017–18

Cup
 Bangladesh Federation Cup
Winners (1): 2019–20
 Independence Cup
Winners (1): 2018–19

Goalscoring records

Top scorers in Premier League

Top scorers in Federation Cup

Top scorers in Independence Cup

Top scorers in AFC Cup

Top scorers in Sheikh Kamal Club Cup

Clean sheets

Bangladesh Premier League only.

Head Coach's records

 First Head Coach:  S. M. Asifuzzaman, from August 2017 to November 2017.
 Longest-serving Head Coach by time:  Óscar Bruzón, from 5 September 2018 to Present (1 year, 9 months, 28 days).
 Longest-serving Head Coach by matches:  Óscar Bruzón managed the club for 51 matches over a period of 1 year and nine months, from September 2018 to Present.

Player records

Goalscorers

 Most goals in all competitions::  Daniel Colindres, 26.
 Most league goals:  Robson Azevedo da Silva, 21.
 Most Federation Cup goals:  Daniel Colindres, 8.
 Most Independence Cup goals:  Motin Mia &  Bakhtiyar Duyshobekov, 2.
 Most Continental goals:  Hernan Barcos, 4.
 First player to score for Bashundhara:  Ripon Biswas (against Uttar Baridhara SC, 7 August 2017).
 Most goals in a season:  Robson Azevedo da Silva, 24 (during the 2020–21 season).
 Most goals in a debut season:  Robson Azevedo da Silva, 24 (during the 2020–21 season).
 Most league goals in a season:  Robson Azevedo da Silva, 21 (during the 2020–21 season).
 Most continental goals in a season:   Hernan Barcos, 4.
 Most hat-tricks: 5 Players, 1.
 Fastest hat-trick:  Daniel Colindres, 13 minutes, (against Team BJMC, 11 November 2018).
 Highest-scoring substitute in Premier League:  Tawhidul Alam Sabuz, 3.
 Most games without scoring for an outfield player in Premier League:  Masuk Mia Jony, 40.
 Youngest goalscorer:  Arif Hossain, 16 years (2017).
 Oldest goalscorer:  Hernan Barcos, 35 years, 11 months, 1 day (against TC Sports Club, 11 March 2020).

Club records

Matches

Firsts
 First Match: Bashundhara Kings 2–2 Uttar Baridhara SC, 7 August 2017.
 First Premier League Match: Bashundhara Kings 1–0 Sheikh Jamal Dhanmondi Club, 19 January 2019.
 First Federation Cup Match: Bashundhara Kings 5–2 Dhaka Mohammedan, 29 October 2018.
 First Independence Cup Match: Bashundhara Kings 2–0 Sheikh Jamal Dhanmondi Club, 2 December 2018.
 First AFC Cup Match: Bashundhara Kings 5–1 TC Sports Club, 11 March 2020.

Wins
 Record win: Bashundhara Kings 5–0 Brothers Union, 16 July 2019.
 Record Premier League win: Bashundhara Kings 5–0 Brothers Union, 16 July 2019.
 Record Federation Cup win: Bashundhara Kings 5–1 Team BJMC, 11 November 2018.
 Record Independence Cup win: Bashundhara Kings 2–0 Sheikh Jamal Dhanmondi Club, 2 December 2018.
 Most league wins in a season:
20 wins from 24 games (during the 2018–19 season).
 Fewest league wins in a season:
3 wins from 6 games (during the 2019–20 season).

Defeats
 Record defeat: 1–5 against NoFeL Sporting Club in BCL, 14 October 2017.
 Record defeat at Sheikh Kamal Stadium: 3–4 against Chittagong Abahani in final, 15 March 2020.
 Record-scoring defeat: 3–4 against Chittagong Abahani in final, 15 March 2020.
 Record Federation Cup defeat: 1–3 against Dhaka Abahani in final, 23 November 2018.
 Record Independence Cup defeat:
 Most league defeats in a season: 
2 defeats from 6 games (during the 2019–20 season).
 Fewest defeats in a season:
1 defeat from 24 games (during the 2018–19 season).

Record consecutive results
 Record consecutive wins: 14 (24 February 2019 to 16 July 2019).
 Record consecutive league wins: 14 (24 February 2019 to 16 July 2019).
 Record consecutive league wins from start of season: 5 (during the 2018–19 season).
 Record consecutive defeats: 
 Record consecutive league matches without a defeat: 20 (from 18 January 2019 to 16 July 2019).
 Record consecutive home league wins: 11 (from 23 January 2019 to 16 July 2019).
 Record consecutive draws:
 Record consecutive home matches without defeat: 
 Record consecutive home league matches without defeat: 13 (from 23 January 2019 to 13 February 2020).
 Record consecutive matches without conceding a goal:

Goals
 Most league goals scored in a season: 54 in 24 games (during the 2018–19 season).
 Fewest league goals scored in a season: 10 in 6 games (during the 2019–20 season).
 Most league goals conceded in a season: 14 in 24 games (during the 2018–19 season).
 Fewest league goals conceded in a season: 9 in 6 games (during the 2019–20 season).
 Most consecutive league matches with a Kings goal: 
 Most consecutive league matches with a Kings goal since the start of a season:

Points
 Most points in a season:
 Three points for a win: 63 (in 24 games in 2018–19).

 Fewest points in a season:
 Three points for a win: 10 (in 6 games in 2019–20).

Continental Record

AFC Club Ranking History

References 

Bashundhara Kings
Sport in Bangladesh